Ginuman is a Papuan language of New Guinea.

References

Languages of Milne Bay Province
Dagan languages